David Whyte may refer to:

David Whyte (footballer) (1971–2014), English footballer
David Whyte (poet) (born 1955), Anglo-Irish poet
David Whyte (tennis), Australian tennis player

See also
David White (disambiguation)